Dlinnoye Lake is a narrow, serpentine lake,  long, lying close northwest of Tsentral'naya Hill in the Schirmacher Hills, Queen Maud Land. The feature was mapped by the Soviet Antarctic Expedition in 1961 and named "Ozero Dlinnoye" (long lake).

References 

Lakes of Queen Maud Land
Princess Astrid Coast